Afreaka! was the first album released by the English rock band Demon Fuzz. It was initially issued in 1970 by Dawn Records, to which the group was signed. The following year, a U.S. pressing was made by Janus Records (catalog number JLS 3028). It was a Billboard "4-STAR" selection in June 1971. In the 21st century, another pressing on vinyl was made by Janus under the same catalog number as the 1971 edition.

Three CD reissues were produced, all of which include as bonus tracks 'Message To Mankind', 'Fuzz Oriental Blues' and the band's cover of Screamin' Jay Hawkins' 'I Put A Spell On You', all from the group's 1970 maxi-single. In Japan, a two-CD (12-cm and 8-cm) set in a gatefold paper sleeve was made by Arcàngelo in 2004. Castle Music released a CD (catalog number CMRCD 1197) in 2005. Esoteric Recordings in the UK issued a CD in 2009 (catalog number ECLEC2111).

The musical style has predominantly been described as progressive rock, psychedelic soul and funk, as well as acid rock, jazz fusion and jazz rock. The recording is sometimes sampled by latter-day DJs.

Track listing

Credits
Sleepy Jack Joseph - bass
Ayinde Folarin - congas
Paddy Corea - congas, flute, sax, arrangements
Steven John - drums
W. Raphael Joseph - guitar 
Ray Rhoden - piano, organ
Barry Murray - production
Clarance Brooms Crosdale - trombone
Smokey Adams - vocals

References

Dawn Records albums
1970 debut albums
Progressive rock albums by English artists
Psychedelic soul albums
Soul albums by English artists
Funk albums by English artists
Acid rock albums
Jazz fusion albums by English artists